Marc Dupuis (born April 22, 1976) is a Canadian retired professional ice hockey defenceman. Dupuis was selected by the Chicago Blackhawks in the fifth round (118th overall) of the 1994 NHL Entry Draft.

Dupuis played six seasons of professional hockey, mostly in the International Hockey League, where he skated in 151 contests to record 47 points and 102 penalty minutes. He also played 84 regular season games in the ECHL, as well as stints in the American Hockey League, Western Professional Hockey League, United Hockey League, and Central Hockey League.

Dupuis retired from professional hockey following the 2001–02 season, but remained active in the Quebec Senior Hockey League as a player with the Cornwall Comets.

In 2012, Dupuis was inducted into the Cornwall Sports Hall of Fame.

References

External links

1976 births
Living people
Amarillo Rattlers players
Belleville Bulls players
Canadian ice hockey defencemen
Chicago Blackhawks draft picks
Columbus Chill players
Fort Wayne Komets players
Hershey Bears players
Ice hockey people from Ontario
Indianapolis Ice players
Knoxville Speed players
Medicine Hat Tigers players
Orlando Solar Bears (IHL) players
Pensacola Ice Pilots players
People from Cornwall, Ontario
Rochester Americans players